The 2015 League1 Ontario season was the first season of play for the Women's Division of League1 Ontario. Originally announced with six teams, a seventh (Woodbridge Strikers) was added before the start of the season. A league cup consisted of two groups of either three or four teams, with the top two from each group advancing to the knockout round.

Teams

Source:

Standings
Each team will play 18 matches as part of the season; three games split home and away against every other team in the division.  There are no playoffs; the first-place team will be crowned as league champion at the end of the season.

Cup
The cup tournament is a separate contest from the rest of the season, in which all seven teams from the women's division take part.  It is not a form of playoffs at the end of the season (as is typically seen in North American sports), but is more like the Canadian Championship or the FA Cup, albeit only for League1 Ontario teams.  All matches are separate from the regular season, and are not reflected in the season standings.

The cup tournament for the women's division consists of two phases.  The first phase is a group phase, where two groups of either three or four teams play in a single round-robin format.  From each group, the top two teams advance to the knockout phase, which consists of a semifinal and a final.

Each match in the group stage must return a result; any match drawn after 90 minutes will advance directly to kicks from the penalty mark, with the winner receiving two points in the standings, while the loser receives one point.  Likewise, any knockout round matches which are tied after full time head directly to penalty kicks instead of extra time.

Group stage 
Group A

Group B

Knockout stage

Semifinals

Final

Top goalscorers

Last updated October 22, 2015.

Awards 

The following players were named League All-Stars.
 First Team All-Stars

 Second Team All-Stars

References

External links

League1
League1 Ontario (women) seasons